Wang Nan (born May 28, 1987 in Jilin) is a Chinese male speed skater. He competed for China at the 2010 Winter Olympics in 500m and 1000m events.

References

1987 births
Living people
Chinese male speed skaters
Olympic speed skaters of China
Sportspeople from Jilin
Speed skaters at the 2010 Winter Olympics
Speed skaters at the 2011 Asian Winter Games
21st-century Chinese people